Conus namocanus, common name the Namocanus cone, is a species of sea snail, a marine gastropod mollusk in the family Conidae, the cone snails and their allies.

Like all species within the genus Conus, these snails are predatory and venomous. They are capable of "stinging" humans, therefore live ones should be handled carefully or not at all.

Description
The size of the shell varies between 40 mm and 100 mm. The spire is usually somewhat convex and striate. The color is white, broadly flamed with chocolate. The body whorl is white or yellowish brown, with irregular chocolate longitudinal striations. The shell is partially interrupted so as to form a central white band. The longitudinal markings are less defined and broader, than in Conus vexillum Gmelin, 1791 to which it resembles. They give a darker shade to the shell.

Distribution
This species occurs in the Red Sea and off Oman; in the Indian Ocean off Madagascar, Tanzania and South Africa.

References

 Kiener L.C. 1844–1850. Spécies général et iconographie des coquilles vivantes. Vol. 2. Famille des Enroulées. Genre Cone (Conus, Lam.), pp. 1–379, pl. 1–111 [pp. 1–48 (1846); 49–160 (1847); 161–192 (1848); 193–240 (1849); 241-[379](assumed to be 1850); plates 4,6 (1844); 2–3, 5, 7–32, 34–36, 38, 40–50 (1845); 33, 37, 39, 51–52, 54–56, 57–68, 74–77 (1846); 1, 69–73, 78–103 (1847); 104–106 (1848); 107 (1849); 108–111 (1850)]. Paris, Rousseau & J.B. Baillière
 Puillandre N., Duda T.F., Meyer C., Olivera B.M. & Bouchet P. (2015). One, four or 100 genera? A new classification of the cone snails. Journal of Molluscan Studies. 81: 1–23

External links
 The Conus Biodiversity website
 Cone Shells – Knights of the Sea
 

namocanus
Gastropods described in 1792